Elena Oetling Ramírez (born 18 April 1993) is a Mexican sailor, who specialized in the Laser Radial class. She finished fifth in her signature class at the 2019 Pan American Games in Lima and was eventually named the country's top female sailor in the single-handed dinghy at the rescheduled 2020 Summer Olympics in Tokyo, sitting distantly in the thirty-second spot. While sailing competitively for the Mexican squad, Oetling trained for the Games at the Vallarta Yacht Club under her personal coach Giorgio Elena.

Oetling competed for the Mexican sailing squad in the women's Laser Radial class at the rescheduled 2020 Summer Olympics in Tokyo. Building up to her Olympic selection, she posted a quintet of marks higher than the tenth position to lock the North American spot over a talented field of Laser Radial sailors at the 2020 Sailing World Cup regatta in Miami, Florida, United States. Oetling endured the initial half of the series with marks lower than the top-twenty before finding a gap to sail towards the seventh spot on the sixth leg. Oetling's best result, however, was not enough to excel her towards the top of the scoreboard, sitting her in the lowly thirty-second position with a net grade of 221 points.

Notes

References

External links
 
 

1993 births
Living people
Mexican female sailors (sport)
Olympic sailors of Mexico
Sailors at the 2020 Summer Olympics – Laser Radial
Sailors at the 2019 Pan American Games
Sportspeople from Jalisco